Presidential elections were held for the first time in France on 10 and 11 December 1848, electing the first and only president of the Second Republic. The election was held on 10 December 1848 and led to the surprise victory of Louis-Napoléon Bonaparte with 74% of the popular vote. This was the only direct presidential election until the 1965 French presidential election.

Background
Following the February 1848 revolution, the French replaced the July Monarchy of Louis-Philippe with a constitutional republic. The new Second Republic was led by a provisional government and then an executive commission, which held democratic elections for a National Constituent Assembly.

The National Constituent Assembly was tasked with drafting a new Constitution for the Second Republic, including the definition of a new head of state to replace the overthrown monarchy. Constitutional debates took place during the period known as the June days uprising. Louis-Napoléon Bonaparte was the only prominent political figure not to be associated with the June uprising in any manner due to him being in England at the time.

The presidency was defined by the terms of the constitution. Rather than the model of the executive committee given by the First Republic, the constitutional committee preferred to entrust executive power in a single individual. The office was given extensive powers to propose legislation, appoint ministers and high-ranking officials, engage in diplomacy, and command the military, though all decisions were subject to approval by the ministers.

Electoral system
The Constitutional Committee decided that the presidential executive should be chosen by universal male suffrage in late May. The procedure for presidential election was ratified by referendum on 6 October and included in the Constitution, which was adopted on 12 November. By the time the Constitution came up for debate in October, opposition to general election for president consisted of monarchists and republicans trying to stop Louis Napoleon. The election was scheduled for 10 December.

The constitution only included provision for one round, and in the absence of a majority for any candidate, the National Assembly would have decided the victor. Louis-Eugène Cavaignac seemed certain to win if the election reached the National Assembly.

Results

Bonaparte had no long political career behind him and was able to depict himself as "all things to some men". The Monarchist right (supporters of either the Legitimist or Orléanist royal households) and much of the upper class supported him as the "least worst" candidate, as a man who would restore order, end the instability in France which had continued since the overthrow of the monarchy during the February Revolution earlier that year, and prevent a proto-communist revolution (in the vein of Friedrich Engels). A good proportion of the industrial working class, on the other hand, were won over by Louis-Napoleon's vague indications of progressive economic views. His overwhelming victory was above all due to the support of the non-politicized rural masses, to whom the name of Bonaparte meant something, as opposed to the other, little-known contenders.

Bonaparte received a plurality or majority in all departments except the Var, Bouches-du-Rhône, Morbihan, and Finistère, all four of which were won by Cavaignac. Thus did Bonaparte become the second president in Europe (after Jonas Furrer of Switzerland) and the first French president to be elected by a popular vote.

References

Presidential elections in France
France
President
French Second Republic